Puthoorkonam is 1 km from Vattiyoorkavu in the Vattiyoorkavu-Peroorkada route, in Thiruvananthapuram, Kerala, India.  Puthoorkonam is famous for the Devi Temple.  A beautiful place surrounded by trees

Events
Kumbhabarani- annual festival of the temple is really a wonderful experience for the people of the place. The festival is conducted for 5 days.

Politics
PURA- Puthoorkonam Residential Association is the organisation of the families of Puthoorkonam.

Suburbs of Thiruvananthapuram